The 2023–23 Liechtenstein Cup is the 78th season of Liechtenstein's annual cup competition. Seven clubs competed with a total of 17 teams for one spot in the second qualifying round of the 2023–24 UEFA Europa Conference League. FC Vaduz are the defending champions.

Participating clubs 

TH Title holders.

Pre-qualification 
The pre-qualification round contained all three "third" teams (FC Triesen III, FC Vaduz III, and USV Eschen/Mauren III) with the final team drawn being given a bye to the round of 16

|colspan="3" style="background-color:#99CCCC" align=center|8 August 2022

|}

Round of 16 
The round of 16 was drawn on the 5th of August. Teams that compete in the 1. Liga or higher (currently FC Vaduz and USV Eschen/Mauren) were seeded, whilst all other teams remained unseeded. All teams that avoided pre-qualification were entered into the competition at this stage

|colspan="3" style="background-color:#99CCCC" align=center|16 August 2022

|-
|colspan="3" style="background-color:#99CCCC"|

|-
|colspan="3" style="background-color:#99CCCC"|

|}

Quarter-finals 
The quarter finals were drawn on 1 September 2022. Due to FC Vaduz qualifying for the UEFA Europa Conference League group stage, their match against USV Eschen Mauren III was rescheduled, instead taking place during the international break.
|colspan="3" style="background-color:#99CCCC" align=center|20 September 2022

|-
|colspan="3" style="background-color:#99CCCC"|

|-
|colspan="3" style="background-color:#99CCCC"|

|}

Semi-finals
The semi-finals involved the four teams who won in the quarter-final round.

|colspan="3" style="background-color:#99CCCC; text-align:center;"| 15 March 2023

|-
|colspan="3" style="background-color:#99CCCC; text-align:center;"| 5 April 2023

|}

References

External links 

  
 Soccerway

Liechtenstein Football Cup seasons
Cup
Liechtenstein Cup